Dayanandnagar railway station is a railway station in New Safilguda, Malkajgiri, Telangana, India. Localities like Dayanandnagar, Radhakrishna(RK)Nagar, Uttam Nagar, Goutham nagar are accessible from this station. The station is used by several people for their morning walks or jogs.

Lines
Hyderabad Multi-Modal Transport System
Secunderabad–Bolarum route (SB Line)

External links
MMTS Timings as per South Central Railway

MMTS stations in Ranga Reddy district
Hyderabad railway division